John ("Jack") Ogilvy Arbuthnott, 14th Viscount of Arbuthnott DL (Montrose, 15 September 1882 – 17 October 1960), was a Scottish Viscount.

Lord Arbuthnott enlisted in the Calgary Light Horse, a unit of the Canadian Army, in February 1917. He was later a lieutenant in the Welsh Guards.

Lord Arbuthnott represented viscounts at the Coronation of Elizabeth II in 1953.

Lord Arbuthnott served as Lord Lieutenant of Kincardineshire from 1926 to his death, was Convenor of Kincardineshire County Council in 1933, and served ten years in the House of Lords (1945–1955) as a representative peer for Scotland.

He married Dorothy Oxley of Ripon.

References

External links

Arbuthnott, John Ogilvy Arbuthnott, 14th Viscount of
Arbuthnott, John Ogilvy Arbuthnott, 14th Viscount of
Arbuthnott, John Ogilvy Arbuthnott, 14th Viscount of
Arbuthnott, John Ogilvy, 14th Viscount of
Arbuthnott, John, 14th Viscount
John Arbuthnott, 14th Viscount
Arbuthnott, John Ogilvy Arbuthnott, 14th Viscount of
Arbuthnott, John Ogilvy Arbuthnott, 14th Viscount of
14